"Fantasy Is Reality" is a song recorded by the funk band Parliament. It was the only single released from the band's 1977 album Live: P-Funk Earth Tour. The song was originally recorded during Parliament's period at Invictus Records.

Unlike the bulk of Live: P-Funk Earth Tour, "Fantasy Is Reality" was recorded in the studio, as was its B-side, "The Landing (Of the Holy Mothership)". "Fantasy Is Reality" was cut from the album's 1991 CD reissue, but was included on the Parliament compilation album Tear the Roof Off 1974-1980. It reached number 54 in the U.S. on Billboard's Hot Soul Singles chart.

Parliament (band) songs
1977 singles
Songs written by George Clinton (funk musician)
Casablanca Records singles
Songs written by Bernie Worrell
Songs written by Leon Ware
1977 songs